Cephalaria is a genus of about 65 species of flowering plants in the family Caprifoliaceae, native to southern Europe, western and central Asia, and northern and southern Africa.

They are annual or perennial herbaceous plants growing to 0.8–2 m tall.

Cephalaria species are used as food plants by the larvae of some Lepidoptera species including Schinia imperialis, which feeds exclusively on C. procera.

Selected species:
Cephalaria alpina (L.) Roem. & Schult.
Cephalaria ambrosioides (Sibth. & Sm.) Roem. & Schult.
Cephalaria anatolica Shkhiyan
Cephalaria aristata C.Koch
Cephalaria coriacea (Willd.) Roem. & Schult. ex Steud.
Cephalaria flava (Sibth. & Sm.) Szabó
Cephalaria gigantea (Ledeb.) Bobrov – Tatarian Cephalaria
Cephalaria joppica (Spreng.) Bég.
Cephalaria laevigata (Waldst. & Kit.) Schrad.
Cephalaria leucantha (L.) Roem. & Schult.
Cephalaria linearifolia Lange
Cephalaria litvinovii Bobrov
Cephalaria pastricensis Dörfl. & Hayek
Cephalaria radiata Griseb. & Schenk
Cephalaria setulifera Boiss. & Heldr.
Cephalaria squamiflora (Sieber) Greuter
Cephalaria scabra (L.f.) Roem. & Schult.
Cephalaria syriaca (L.) Roem. & Schult. – Syrian Cephalaria
Cephalaria tchihatchewii Boiss.
Cephalaria transylvanica (L.) Roem. & Schult.
Cephalaria uralensis (Murray) Roem. & Schult.

Cultivation and uses
Some species are grown as ornamental plants in gardens. The most popular species is C. gigantea, a perennial species from the Caucasus growing to 2 m tall, valued for its strong erect growth with dark green foliage and yellow flowers.

See also
Flora Europaea: Cephalaria
Flora of Pakistan: Cephalaria

References

 
Caprifoliaceae genera